Todd Sinnott (born 19 February 1992) is an Australian professional golfer. He won the 2017 Leopalace21 Myanmar Open, his first win on the Asian Tour, winning the first prize of US$135,000. The win came just two weeks after Sinnott finished second in the 2017 Asian Tour qualifying school, losing to fellow-Australian Richard Green at the first hole of a sudden-death playoff.

Professional wins (2)

Japan Golf Tour wins (1)

1Co-sanctioned by the Asian Tour

Asian Tour wins (1)

1Co-sanctioned by the Japan Golf Tour

PGA Tour of Australasia wins (1)

1Mixed event with the WPGA Tour of Australasia

Results in major championships

"T" = tied

Team appearances
Amateur
Australian Men's Interstate Teams Matches (representing Victoria): 2011, 2012, 2013, 2014 (winners)

References

External links

Australian male golfers
PGA Tour of Australasia golfers
Asian Tour golfers
Japan Golf Tour golfers
Golfers from Melbourne
1992 births
Living people